Mamadou Saliou Diallo (born 17 March 1995) is a Guinean professional footballer who plays as a forward for Águia FC Vimioso. He also holds a Portuguese citizenship.

References

External links 
 
 Mamadou Diallo at ZeroZero

1995 births
Living people
Association football forwards
Guinean footballers
Portuguese footballers
Real S.C. players
FC Zimbru Chișinău players
G.D. Vitória de Sernache players
C.F. Os Armacenenses players
AD Oliveirense players
Juventude de Pedras Salgadas players
Campeonato de Portugal (league) players
Moldovan Super Liga players
Portuguese expatriate footballers
Portuguese expatriate sportspeople in Moldova
Expatriate footballers in Moldova